Breathless is a 1983 American neo-noir romantic thriller film directed by Jim McBride, written by McBride and L. M. Kit Carson, and starring Richard Gere and Valérie Kaprisky. It is a remake of the 1960 French film of the same name directed by Jean-Luc Godard and written by Godard and François Truffaut. The original film is about an American woman and a French criminal in Paris, while the remake is vice versa in Los Angeles.

Plot
Jesse Lujack (Richard Gere) is a cocky, hedonistic drifter, and small time car thief,  in Las Vegas. He’s obsessed with Silver Surfer comic books, the rock and roll music of Jerry Lee Lewis, and Monica Poiccard (Valérie Kaprisky), a UCLA architecture undergraduate whom he knows only from a weekend fling while she visited Vegas.

Leaving Las Vegas, Lujack steals a Porsche, intending to drive to Los Angeles. As he speeds down the highway and looks through the owner's possessions, Lujack discovers a handgun in the vehicle's glovebox, which he briefly toys with. He comes upon a highway construction roadblock and evades it. Seeing his reckless driving, a Patrolman gives chase and the fleeing Lujack runs off the road and becomes stuck. When the Officer spotlights him and orders him to step away from the car, Lujack impulsively grabs the gun, and blindly shoots through the back window of the car, inadvertently mortally wounding the Patrolman. The remorseful Lujack pads the dying Officers head with his coat, and flees on foot.  Arriving in Los Angeles, Lujack finds his picture splashed all over the newspaper and TV news as the "cop killer."

On the run, but unable to immediately leave LA while arranging to get paid for a previous car theft, under the alias of Jack Burns, Lujack breaks into Monica's apartment and waits for her to return home. Monica discovers him naked in her bed and initially declines his advances but later has sex with him in the shower. Lujack attempts to convince Monica to abscond to Mexico with him. However, Monica is a star architectural student with big plans and reluctant. Lujack shows up at her college and intrudes on her presentation of a project to her professors, initially exasperating her, but he continues to pursue her, showing up in various stolen cars to offer her rides. He eventually wears down her defenses and she succumbs to his charms once again, although still ambivalent to his insistence on accompanying him to Mexico.

After Lujack's photograph appears in the newspaper, he is recognized on the street right after dropping Monica off at a groundbreaking ceremony downtown. The police find Monica and question her on the street but Monica, once again under Jesse’s spell, refuses to turn him in.  When the police start following her right before Lujack comes back to pick her up, she finally accepts his offer to flee to Mexico together.

On the way out of LA, Lujack and Monica stop in order for Jesse to repair his latest stolen car. Monica walks to a nearby store and finds that her picture is on the front page of the national newspaper alongside Lujack's. Realizing the impossibility of her romantic fantasy, Monica phones the police, but then returns to tell Lujack she did so. Jesse asks her if she loves him, and she says no. He laughs and says “liar”. He then runs up the road to meet an accomplice he has arranged to bring his payment for the previous car theft, who throws a gun to him as well, which Lujack refuses and allows to drop to the street. The police corner him in the road where Lujack sings "Breathless" to Monica while dancing around the gun at his feet. The film ends in a freeze-frame of Jesse scooping up the gun and turning to face the police.

Cast
 Richard Gere as Jesse Lujack
 Valérie Kaprisky as Monica Poiccard
 Art Metrano as Birnbaum
 John P. Ryan as Lieutenant Parmental
 Robert Dunn as Sergeant Enright
 Lisa Persky as Salesgirl
 James Hong as Grocer
 Georg Olden as Skateboarding Kid
 Miguel Pinero as Carlito
 Sunny Ade as Sunny

Soundtrack 
There is no official soundtrack released. Along with the incidental music for the movie, provided by Jack Nitzsche, these are the songs that are featured in the film:
 "Bad Boy" - Mink DeVille
 "High School Confidential" - Jerry Lee Lewis
 "Breathless" - Jerry Lee Lewis
 "Final Sunset" - Brian Eno
 "Wonderful World" - Sam Cooke
 "Opening" - Philip Glass
 "No Me Hagas Sufrir" - Ismael Quintana / Eddie Palmieri
 "Suspicious Minds" - Elvis Presley
 "Wind on Wind" - Brian Eno
 "Wind on Water" - Brian Eno and Robert Fripp
 "Jack the Ripper" - Link Wray
 "365 Is My Number / The Message" - King Sunny Adé
 "Celtic Soul Brothers" - Dexy's Midnight Runners
 "Message of Love" - The Pretenders
 "Caca de Vaca" - Joe "King" Carrasco
 "Breathless" - X

Release
It was released in the United States on May 13, 1983 by Orion Pictures. Breathless was screened at the Dallas International Film Festival on April 18, 2015.

Home media
Breathless was released on VHS in the United States and United Kingdom by Orion Pictures and Rank with a LaserDisc available in 1983. It debuted on DVD in the U.S. in April 2000 by Metro-Goldwyn-Mayer with the theatrical trailer and booklet. In the U.S. and Canada, Shout Factory released the film in April 2015 on Blu-ray with one extra feature; a  theatrical trailer.

Reception

Box office
The film grossed $19,910,002 in the United States.

Critical response
Upon release, it received mixed reviews. On Rotten Tomatoes it has an approval rating of 60% based on reviews from 15 critics. On Metacritic it has a score of 52% based on reviews from 13 critics, indicating "mixed or average reviews". Roger Ebert's contemporary review was a mixed 2.5 stars out of 4. He felt the film's mix of art-house and noir styles would not appeal to "average audiences" and believed Kaprisky was miscast and often seemed "lost", but praised Gere's performance: "I thought Gere was deliberately repugnant, but in an interesting way".

The film has since gained minor cult status. American director Quentin Tarantino cited it as one of the "coolest" movies, commenting: "Here's a movie that indulges completely all my obsessions - comic books, rockabilly music and movies."
The Silver Surfer poster in Freddy Newandyke's apartment seen in Reservoir Dogs is a homage to Jesse's Silver Surfer-obsession.

British critic Mark Kermode is a fan of the film, and prefers it over the French original.

See also
 Breathless (1960 film)
 List of American films of 1983

References

External links
 
 
 
 
 

1983 films
1983 crime drama films
1983 romantic drama films
1980s romantic thriller films
American crime drama films
American neo-noir films
American remakes of French films
American romantic drama films
1980s English-language films
Films directed by Jim McBride
Films scored by Jack Nitzsche
Orion Pictures films
1980s American films